Thomas Calvin Baker (June 11, 1913 – January 3, 1991), nicknamed "Rattlesnake", was an American Major League Baseball player. He was a pitcher for four seasons (1935–38) with the Brooklyn Dodgers and New York Giants.

Baker died in 1991 and was interred at Greenwood Memorial Park in Fort Worth, Texas along with Pete Donohue and Jackie Tavener.

References

External links

Tom Baker stats on the San Francisco Giants website

1913 births
1991 deaths
Brooklyn Dodgers players
New York Giants (NL) players
Major League Baseball pitchers
Baseball players from Texas
Jersey City Giants players
Springfield Nationals players
Greenville Spinners players
People from Victoria County, Texas